Hell's Bells was a British television comedy series made by BBC Television starring Derek Nimmo as the traditionalist Dean "Selwyn" Makepeace who found himself consistently at loggerheads with his modernising new Bishop Godfrey Hethercote (played by Robert Stephens). It was first broadcast in 1986, and only one series was made.

DVD release

No DVD Release has yet been announced for the sitcom.

External links

1986 British television series debuts
1986 British television series endings
1980s British sitcoms
BBC television sitcoms
English-language television shows